Senator Finn may refer to:

Skip Finn (1948–2018), Minnesota State Senate
Walter L. Finn (1875–1936), Illinois State Senate